Paktia University is a public higher education institution in Gardez, Afghanistan. Its current chancellor is Dr. Sayed Wali Jalalzai. According to him, approximately 8,500 students are enrolled in Paktia University. Majority are male students. There are approximately 145 professors. The university's acceptance rate was reported at 55%.

Paktia University was established in 2004 after the Governor's office of Paktia Province presented a proposal to the Transitional Islamic State of Afghanistan about building a university in the province. According to the proposal, it was recognized as a non-profit and a bachelor graduate-based level foundation.

Until March 2009, the university shared a building with a teacher training college. Paktia University currently consists of at least two faculties in fields of agriculture and education, medical, law and political science, engineering, economics.

Aryana University merger
Aryana University was a private education institute in Peshawar, Pakistan, mainly for the Afghan refugees. After long requests by the people of Paktia Province, Aryana University was merged with Paktia University.

Before the merger, the institution had an enrollment of approximately 1,000 students in the faculties of Agriculture and Education. After the merger, the number of students was increased to approximately 3,000 with an addition of three more faculties: Medical, Engineering and Law.

See also
List of universities in Afghanistan

References

Universities in Afghanistan
Educational institutions established in 2004
2004 establishments in Afghanistan